The Divisiones Regionales de Fútbol in  Castilla-La Mancha, organized by the Castilla-La Mancha Football Federation:
Primera Autonómica Preferente, 2 Groups of 18 teams (Level 6 of the Spanish football pyramid)
Primera División Autonómica, 4 Groups of 18 teams (Level 7)
Segunda División Autonómica, 6 Groups of 18 teams (Level 8)

League chronology
Timeline

Primera Autonómica Preferente
 
Primera Autonómica Preferente is the sixth level of competition of the Spanish football league system in the Castilla-La Mancha.

League System
It consists of two groups of 18 teams. 
Group winners are promoted and runners-up plays a promotion playoffs. 
Last four teams of every group are relegated.

2019–20 season teams

Champions

Primera División Autonómica

Primera División Autonómica is the seventh level of competition of the Spanish football league system in the Castilla-La Mancha.

Segunda División Autonómica

Segunda División Autonómica is the eighth level of competition of the Spanish football league system in the Castilla-La Mancha.

External links
Federación de Fútbol de Castilla La Mancha
Futbolme.com
ManchaMedia

Football in Castilla–La Mancha
Divisiones Regionales de Fútbol